The Indian Creek Correctional Center (ICCC) is a Virginia Department of Corrections (VADOC) state prison for men.

The facility was opened in 1994 and specializes in long-term treatment of incarcerated substance abusers. The medium security facility houses inmates in dormitory-style quarters, split into six housing units.  In June 2008, the prison had an average daily population of 1,002 inmates.

The ICCC is adjacent to VADOC's St. Brides Correctional Center, which houses inmates not requiring specialized treatment for substance abuse.

History
In April 2014, reports of inmates being medically neglected were picked up by local media. Another inmate was alleged to have reported heart attack symptoms to medical staff, and was treated with Advil and was given a suggestion to schedule a follow-up appointment. The inmate allegedly died that night of the heart attack. The American Civil Liberties Union has accused the for-profit companies contracted by the Virginia Department of Corrections of withholding medical care to reduce expenses.

On November 8, 2014, inmate Dai’Yaan Qamar Longmire, 19, committed suicide while in solitary confinement at Indian Creek Correctional Center. A lawsuit filed by Longmire's mother against the Virginia Department of Corrections and ICCC, states he was diagnosed with bipolar disorder, depression, ADHD and anxiety before his incarceration in May 2014. The lawsuit alleges VADOC did not provide Longmire with medication for his conditions, which he had been taking prior to imprisonment. The suit further alleges prison staff failed to take precautionary measures for an inmate with a history of mental illness, such as placing Longmire on suicide watch, or removing bedding and other objects he could use to injure himself. Longmire had been held in solitary confinement as a punitive measure for misconduct from October 5, 2014, until his death, 34 days later.

In October 2015, YouTube personality Joseph Guerrero was released from Indian Creek, at the end of a 7-year sentence. He now hosts the "AfterPrisonShow" (stylized as one word) channel and series. 

In May 2016, nine inmates suspected of using scheduled narcotics were hospitalized with overdose symptoms. One of the inmates tested positive for opioids. The Virginia Department of Corrections stated procedural changes to visitation by the public may stem as a result of the incident.

References

External links
Official website

Prisons in Virginia
Buildings and structures in Chesapeake, Virginia
1994 establishments in Virginia